Murlatinamakhi (Dargwa: Мурлатинамахьи) is a rural locality (a selo) in Natsinsky Selsoviet, Akushinsky District, Republic of Dagestan, Russia. The population was 29 as of 2010.

Geography 
Murlatinamakhi is located 34 km south of Akusha (the district's administrative centre) by road. Karayamakhi is the nearest rural locality.

References 

Rural localities in Akushinsky District